The Bori are an indigenous tribe of the Adi people living in the districts of East Siang, Upper Siang, Siang and West Siang in the Indian state of Arunachal Pradesh.

The Bori constitute a group of people inhabiting in the central portion of Siyom  Valley and a major portion of the Sike Valley between Mega in the South and Gasheng in the north of Siang District. Of the 13 villages over which the Bori population is spread, Gate, Gauteng, Gaming, Payum, Yio, Molo, Dupu, Cheying, Row, Bogu, Mega, Pame and Reying. Payum as its headquarters.

Dupu and Yio, Bogu and Mega are situated on the left bank of Siyom; Dupu and Yio above the confluence of Siyom and Sike, while Bogu and Mega below it. Pame is also situated below the confluence but on the right bank of Siyom River.

Gate, Gasheng and Payum are located along the right bank of Sike and Gaming on its left bank. Comparatively, it forms a small fraction, about 3.9 percent area of the district. The population represents approximately 4.3 percent of the entire population of the district.

Organisation and lifestyle 

The Adi Bori tribe are mostly found in Payum circle.  In Bori villages, a leader styled Gam burah or Gao Burah moderates the council of the village. The head of the council is chosen by unanimous decision by the people of the council.  To solve a village problem, the villagers get together in the village kebang in the presence of the council head. Bori people practice rice cultivation, and it is considered the main staple food. They practice hunting and trapping as well.  Bori people raise mithuns, chickens, and pigs. Domestic vegetables are also cultivated. Their lifestyle is similar to the other tribes of the Siang district.

Languages 
The language spoken by this group is a Sino-Tibetan language known as Bori or Adi.  It is spoken with major variations among all the Bori-Adi subgroups.

Festival 
The Adi Bori celebrate their own festival known as Donggin. In the Adi language, Donggin translates to "spring season". The Tribal people welcome spring by celebrating Donggin from 2 February to 5 February every year. They celebrate this festival for good harvesting as well. In this festival, they sacrifice mithuns, pigs and chickens to Ane Donggin for health & prosperity.

References

Bibliography 
 Danggen, Bani. (2003). The kebang: A unique indigenous political institution of the Adis. Delhi: Himalayan Publishers. 
 Hamilton, A. (1983 [1912]). In Abor jungles of north-east India. Delhi: Mittal Publications.
 Danggen, Bani. (2003). A book of conversation: A help book for English to Adi conversation. Itanagar: Himalayan Publishers. .
 BBC TV program Tribe, episode on the Adi; explorer Bruce Parry lived among them for a month as an honorary tribesman, 'adopted' by a village gam.
 Mibang, Tamo; & Chaudhuri, S. K. (Eds.) (2004). Folk culture and oral literature from north-east India. New Delhi: Mittal. .
 Nyori, Tai (1993). History and Culture of the Adis, Omsons Publications, New Delhi-110 027.
 Lego, N. N. (1992). British relations with the Adis, 1825-1947. New Delhi: Omsons Publications. .
 Mibang, Tamo; & Abraham, P. T. (2001). An introduction to Adi language. Itanagar, Arunachal Pradeh: Himalayan Publishers. .

Tribes of Arunachal Pradesh
Scheduled Tribes of India